Snafu is a 1945 American comedy film directed by Jack Moss and written by Louis Solomon and Harold Buchman. It is based on the 1944 play Snafu by Louis Solomon and Harold Buchman. The film stars Robert Benchley, Barbara Jo Allen, Conrad Janis, Nanette Parks, Janis Wilson, Jimmy Lloyd and Enid Markey. The film was released on November 22, 1945, by Columbia Pictures.

Plot

Cast          
Robert Benchley as Ben Stevens
Barbara Jo Allen as Madge Stevens
Conrad Janis as Ronald Stevens
Nanette Parks as Laura Jessup
Janis Wilson as Kate Hereford
Jimmy Lloyd as Danny Baker
Enid Markey as Aunt Emily Andrews
Eva Puig as Josephina
Ray Mayer as Detective
Marcia Mae Jones as Martha
Winfield Smith as Col. West
John Souther as Taylor
Byron Foulger as Phil Ford
Kathleen Howard as Dean Garrett

References

External links
 

1945 films
American comedy films
1945 comedy films
Columbia Pictures films
American black-and-white films
Pacific War films
Japan in non-Japanese culture
Films scored by Paul Sawtell
1940s English-language films
1940s American films